Raigachi is a census town in the Rajarhat CD block in the Barasat Sadar subdivision in North 24 Parganas district in the Indian state of West Bengal. It is close to Kolkata and also a part of Kolkata Urban Agglomeration.

Geography

Location
Raigachi is close to Action Area II C and II D of New Town. Deara is located nearby.

Area overview
Rajarhat, a rural area earlier, adjacent to Kolkata, is being transformed into an upmarket satellite township, with modern business hubs, luxury real estate and eye-catching shopping malls. With enormous construction activity taking place all around, things are changing fast, leaving behind a description at any given point of time as outdated in no time. Bidhannagar subdivision consists of Bidhannagar Municipality, Mahishbathan II Gram Panchayat and Rajarhat-Gopalpur Municipality (subsequently merged to form Bidhannagar Municipal Corporation since 2015), including Nabadiganta Industrial Township (Bidhannagar Sector - V) and Rajarhat (Community development block).

Note: The map alongside presents some of the notable locations in the subdivision. All places marked in the map are linked in the larger full screen map.

Demographics

Population
According to the 2011 Census of India, Raigachi had a total population of 8,245, of which 4,196 (51%) were males and 4,049 (49%) were females. Population in the age range 0–6 years was 1,045. The total number of literate persons in Raigachi was 5,604 (77.83% of the population over 6 years).

 India census, Raigachi had a population of 6728. Males constitute 51% of the population and females 49%. Raigachi has an average literacy rate of 55%, lower than the national average of 59.5%: male literacy is 58% and female literacy is 52%. In Raigachhi, 16% of the population is under 6 years of age.

Kolkata Urban Agglomeration
The following Municipalities and Census Town in Barasat Sadar subdivision were part of Kolkata Urban Agglomeration, according to the 2011 census: Barasat (M), Madhyamgram (M), Rajarhat-Gopalpur (M) (made part of Bidhannagar Municipal Corporation in 2015) and Raigachi (CT).

Infrastructure
As per District Census Handbook 2011, Raigachi covered an area of 1.57 km2. It had 6 primary schools, 3 middle schools and 3 secondary schools. The nearest degree college was 3 km away at Krishnapur. The nearest hospital with 20 beds was 1 km away.

Transport
SRCM Road and Rajarhat Main Road (part of State Highway 3) pass along the north and south boundaries of Raigachhi.

Bus

Private Bus
 91 Shyambazar - Bhangar Kanthalia (via SRCM Road)
 91A Shyambazar - Haroa (via SRCM Road)
 91C Shyambazar - Lauhati (via SRCM Road)
 211 Ahiritola - Kharibari/Patharghata (via Rajarhat Main Road)
 211A Ahiritola - Langalpota (via Rajarhat Main Road)

Bus Routes Without Numbers
 Nabanna - Rajarhat Chowmatha (via Rajarhat Main Road)
 Shyambazar - Polerhat (via Rajarhat Main Road)

Healthcare
North 24 Parganas district has been identified as one of the areas where ground water is affected by arsenic contamination.

See also
  Map Rajarhat CD Block on Page 605 of District Census Handbook.

References

Cities and towns in North 24 Parganas district
Neighbourhoods in Kolkata
Kolkata Metropolitan Area